Gladzor is a village in the Yeghegnadzor Municipality of the Vayots Dzor Province in Armenia. The historic 13th-century University of Gladzor is located in the village, and the 13th-century Proshaberd fortress is located 6-7 km to the north of the village. The village is immediately bordered by the town of Yeghegnadzor to the south.

Gallery

References

External links 

Populated places in Vayots Dzor Province